Route 608 or Highway 608 may refer to:

Canada
 Alberta Highway 608
 Ontario Highway 608

Costa Rica
 National Route 608

Czech Republic

Finland

Italy

Malaysia
 Malaysia Federal Route 608

Philippines

United Kingdom
 A608

United States
 
 
 
  (former)
  (former)